Salsapuna() also known as Sal Sapuna is a long running Sri Lankan television drama series broadcast on television network Sirasa TV and directed by Nalan Mendis. It is a drama about the conflicts between family members due to their social and political backgrounds. The character Podi Patharakari portrayed by the actress Michelle Dilhara became popular among the Sri Lankan audience.

Plot 

The story begins when Aliya returns to Kethaliya's home. Prabath, Yamuna, Revathi Kethaliya and Nilhan live there. Yamuna and Prabath find difficulties in earning their living for, while Revathi finds proposals for her, the proposal never succeeded. Nilhan works as a journalist near the Narmada. Suren unwillingly married Judy tries his best to win the heart of Narmada, but fails in the face of utmost difficulty. The families face many problems while their mother, Kethaliya, and Aliya become helpless in every situation.

A few years later, Narmada marries Suren, but Suren's political background and Narmada's media background complicate their relationship. Aliya starts an affair with Rihanna, but their families are enemies. Aliya and Rihanna elope, hoping to have a better family life on their own, but meet with an accident.

Cast and characters 

Iranganie Serasinghe as old Aliya
Shanali Weerasinghe as young Aliya
Roshan Pilapitiya as Kumara Premathilaka
Michelle Dilhara - as Preethi - Podi Patharakari
Sangeeth Prabu Shankar - as Nilhan
Damitha Abeyratne  - as Revathi
Gayani Gisanthika - as Yamuna
Rohana Baddage - as Nandapala Warnaweera
Ramya Wanigasekara - as Kethaliya
Janaka Kumbukage - as Prabath
Amaya Adikari - as Narmada
Ranil Kulasinghe - as Suren 
Gihani Weerasinghe - as Gihani
Iresha Ranasinghe - as Judy
Manel Wanaguru - as Shana
Rangi Rajapaksha - as Krishni
Dinindu Ekanayake - as Daham
Madhava Wijesinghe - as Vihanga

Characters 

The character Podi Patharakari was introduced in the 250th episode by the director Nalan Mendis. The character was introduced as the girlfriend of Nilhan. Nilhan meets a new friend, Podi Patharakari played by Michelle Dilhara, who came from London to study journalism. She challenges Nilhan that she will be Narmada's best student. Meanwhile, Narmada opens her own office, recruiting Nilhan, Podi Patharakari, and Manual. Podi Patharakari and Nilhan gradually build up a friendship but tend to always fight. Podi Patharakari  has feelings for Nilhan, but Nilhan ignores her. Therefore, Podi Patharakari  challenges Nilhan saying that she will win his heart. Gradually Nilhan starts to have feelings for Podi Patharakari. The character Podi Patharakari portrayed by Michelle Dilhara,

References

Sri Lankan drama television series
2000s Sri Lankan television series
2007 Sri Lankan television series debuts
2008 Sri Lankan television series endings
Sirasa TV original programming